Disphragis thrinax is a moth of the family Notodontidae. It is found in north-eastern Ecuador.

The length of the forewings is 18 mm. The ground colour of the forewings is greenish white and the ground colour of the hindwings is white.

Etymology
The species name is derived from Greek thrinax (meaning trident) and refers to the shape of the uncus.

References

Moths described in 2011
Notodontidae